Societal attitudes towards abortion have varied throughout different historical periods and cultures. One manner of assessing such attitudes in the modern era has been to conduct opinion polls to measure levels of public opinion on abortion.

Attitudes by region

Africa
South Africa: A 2003 Human Sciences Research Council study examined moral attitudes among South Africans: 56% said they believed that abortion is wrong even if there is a strong chance of serious defect in the fetus, while 70% said they believed that abortion is wrong if done primarily because the parents have low income and may be unable to afford another child.

Europe

Austria: A May 2007 OGM survey examined Austrian opinion on the morality of abortion, asking, "Personally, do you think of abortion as a moral issue?" 20% of those polled replied, "yes, always", 59% replied "yes, under certain circumstances", 19% replied "no, never", and 2% replied that they were "not sure".
Czech Republic: A May 2007 CVVM poll found that 72% believe abortion in the Czech Republic should be allowed "at the request of the woman", 19% that it should be allowed for "societal reasons", 5% that it should be allowed only if "a woman's health is at risk", 1% that it should be "banned".
Republic of Ireland: A January 2010 Irish Examiner/RedC poll about abortion in Ireland found that 60% of 18- to 35-year-olds felt abortion should be legalised, and 10% had been in a relationship in which an abortion had taken place. A January 2010 opinion poll conducted by Millward Brown Landsdowne for the Pro Life Campaign found 70% of people questioned favored constitutional protection for the unborn under circumstances where intervention to save the mother's life was legal. A January 2013 Paddy Power/Red C poll of 1,002 adults found that 29% of voters believed that there should be a constitutional amendment to allow abortion "in any case where the woman requests it". Support was highest at 37% within the 18- to 35-year-old age group. In 2018, The Thirty-sixth amendment of the constitution of Ireland, was voted for by 66.40% of the Irish population, receiving a majority in all constituency of the republic apart form Donegal
Great Britain: A January 2010 Angus Reid Public Opinion poll asked "Do you think abortion should be legal under any circumstances, legal only under certain circumstances, or illegal in all circumstances?" 36% responded that they believe abortion should be legal in all circumstances, 55% that it should be legal in certain circumstances, and 3% that it should be illegal in all circumstances.
 Poland: An April 2019 Kantar poll in Poland found 58% of Poles supported women to have the right to abortion on-demand up to the 12th week of pregnancy, 35% opposed and 7% had no opinion. A poll from 28 October 2020 found that 22% of Poles supported abortion-on demand, 62% only in certain cases and 11% thought it should be completely illegal.

2005 poll of ten countries
A May 2005 Euro RSCG/TNS Sofres poll examined attitudes toward abortion in 10 European countries, asking polltakers whether they agreed with the statement, "If a woman doesn't want children, she should be able to have an abortion".
Results were as follows:

Eastern Europe/Eurasia study
An April 2003 CDC/ORC Macro report examined sentiment on abortion among women aged 15 to 44 in six former-Comecon countries, asking, "Do you think that (in any situation) a woman always has (or should have) the right to decide about her (own) pregnancy, including whether to have an abortion?"
The results were:

Among those whose response was "no" above, it was then asked if abortion would be acceptable under selected circumstances. Positive responses to this subsequent question were:

North and Central America
 Canada: A December 2001 Gallup poll about abortion in Canada, asked, "Do you think abortions should be legal under any circumstances, legal only under certain circumstances or illegal in all circumstances and in what circumstances?" 32% responded that they believe abortion should be legal in all circumstances, 52% that it should be legal in certain circumstances, and 14% that it should be legal in no circumstances.
Mexico: A November 2005 IMO poll about abortion in Mexico found that 73.4% think abortion should not be legalized while 11.2% think it should.
Nicaragua: An August–September 2006 Greenberg Quinlan Rosner Research poll on the legality of abortion to save a woman's life found that 20% of respondents felt strongly that it should be "legal", 49% felt somewhat that it should be "legal", 18% felt strongly that it should be "illegal", and 10% felt somewhat that it should be "illegal".
Panama: A May 2005 Dichter & Neira/La Prensa poll found that 89.4% disagreed with abortion and 8.3% agreed.
Canada: A January 2010 Angus Reid Public Opinion poll found that 40% of Canadians think abortion should be permitted in all cases, while 31% support it with some restrictions; 41% say the health care system should pay for abortions only in emergency cases; 53% say under-aged girls should need parental consent for abortions.
United States: A 2022 study that reviewing existing literature and public opinion datasets found that 43.8% in the U.S. are consistently "pro-choice" whereas 14.8% are consistently "pro-life." Support for abortion has gradually increased over time in the U.S. since the Roe v. Wade ruling.
United States: A January 2010 Angus Reid Public Opinion poll found that 30% of Americans think abortion should be permitted only in cases of rape, incest, or to save the woman's life; 44% agree with banning abortion coverage through insurance companies subsidized by the government,while 42% disagree; 31% claim pregnant women don't have enough information about alternatives to abortion.
 United States: A February 2007 CBS News poll about abortion in the U.S. asked, "What is your personal feeling about abortion?", and 30% said that it should be "permitted only in cases such as rape, incest or to save the woman's life", 31% said that abortion should be "permitted in all cases", 16% that it should be "permitted, but subject to greater restrictions than it is now", 12% said that it should "only be permitted to save the woman's life", and 5% said that it should "never" be permitted.  The Gallup poll has obtained the following results:

Oceania
Australia:  Since at least the 1980s, public opinion polls have shown a majority of Australians support abortion rights, and that support for abortion is increasing. In 2003, a poll by the Australian Survey of Social Attitudes found that 81% of Australians believe a woman should have the right to choose an abortion, and a 2007 poll by the same group found 4% of Australians are opposed to abortion in all circumstances.

South America
Argentina: A September 2011 survey conducted by the nonprofit organization Catholics for Choice found that 45% of Argentines are in favor of abortion for any reason in the first twelve weeks. This same poll conducted in September 2011 also suggests that most Argentines favor abortion being legal when a woman's health or life is at risk (81%), when the pregnancy is a result of rape (80%) or the fetus has severe abnormalities (68%).
Brazil: In 2021, a survey conducted by PoderData, found that, 58% of Brazilians are against the legalization of abortion in Brazil, those who are favorable of legalization add up to 31%. Another 11% do not know or do not respond.
Chile: A 2014 poll found that 70% of Chileans supported abortion if a mother's life is in danger, if a foetus is unviable or when a pregnancy is a result of rape. According to a Pew Research Center poll in 2014, in Chile, public opinion is divided on the issue; 47% say that abortion should be legal in all or most cases, while 49% say it should be illegal in all or most circumstances.
Colombia: A September 2017 survey, conducted by the nonprofit Table for Life and Women's Health, found that 65% of Colombians believe that abortion should be legal for certain circumstances.
Uruguay: A May 2007 Factum/El Espectador survey asked Uruguayans about a law under debate in their country's Senate, which would legalize abortion within the first 12 weeks of pregnancy, finding that 61% support the law, 27% oppose the law, and 12% are unsure about it.

Attitudes by religion

Christianity
An October 2006 Pew Research Center survey of moral opinion among Christians in 10 countries asked "... [Do] you think abortion can always be justified, sometimes be justified, or never be justified?"   

The poll also asked respondents whether they agreed with the statement, "The government should not interfere with a woman's ability to have an abortion".

Buddhism

Hinduism

Islam
According to a 2014 poll by The Pew Research Center surveying 237 people, 55% of American Muslims supported legal abortion in all or most cases, while 37% are opposed to legal abortion in all or must cases.

Atheism

According to a 2014 poll by The Pew Research Center surveying 1,098 people, 87% of American atheists supported abortion's legality in all or most cases, and 11% opposed abortion's legality in all or most cases.

Among physicians
A survey in the United States of more than 10,000 physicians (not only obstetricians) came to the result that 34% of physicians would perform an abortion in certain situations, even if it were against their own beliefs. Approximately 54% would not, and for the remaining 12%, it would depend on circumstances.

See also
Abortion debate
Abortion law

External links
 Angus Reid Global Monitor - Global Polls on Abortion
 Polling Report: Abortion and birth control

References

Abortion debate
Public opinion
Social philosophy